Pack Monday Fair is an annual street fair held in the country town of Sherborne in Dorset, starting on the Monday following 10 October (Old Michaelmas Day). Originally an agricultural fair, it is now devoted to stalls, sideshows and a funfair.

Origins

The origins of the fair are unknown, though it must be of some antiquity as John Hutchins in the second edition of his History and Antiquities of the County of Dorset (1815) states that it has been an "immemorial custom", for boys and young men to blow horns in the evenings in the streets for some weeks before the fair "to the no small annoyance of their less wakeful neighbours". The fair was ushered in by cows' horns and by the ringing of the great bell at a very early hour of the morning. It was a great holiday for the inhabitants of the town and neighbourhood.

According to one local tradition, set out in William Hone’s Every Day Book of 1826, the fair and its noisy announcement originated at the completion of the building of Sherborne Abbey when the workmen ‘packed up’ their tools and “held a fair or wake, in the churchyard, blowing cows' horns in their rejoicing”.

The folklorist Steve Roud in his 2006 book The English Year suggests that the word ‘pack’ in the title of the fair is in fact more likely to refer to the day on which workers packed up their belongings to move house at the end of the annual term of employment, Old Michaelmas Day being one of the most common days for the annual move. Alternatively, ‘pack’ may relate to itinerant sellers and their wares (as in ‘pack-man’ or ‘packhorse’). The theory that ‘pack’ is a dialect term for the ‘pacts’ made between farmers and workers at the fair he considers unlikely as that usage is not known locally.

18th- and 19th-Century fair
A diary entry written by Richard Bellamy, a local solicitor's articled clerk, describes an evening performance at the town's Swan Inn during the fair of 1794:

An extensive description of the fair in the early 19th century, when the whole town was taken over by the event, appears in William Hone's Every Day Book of 1826. The fair is described as

Teddy Roe's Band

The custom of announcing the fair with rough music continues to the present day. Teddy Roe's (or Rowe's) Band, as it is now known, is made up of the youth of the town and makes a great deal of noise with tin cans, horns and whistles.

Teddy Roe is by tradition supposed to be the foreman of the masons who were working on the fan vault of Sherborne Abbey in 1490. They were given a day off to visit the fair, packed up their tools, and marched in joyful procession to the fairground. Roud states, however, that this story is without foundation, and that the heralding of fairs with noisy processions of this type is known from many other examples up and down the country.

Teddy Roe's band was suppressed in the 1960s, because of the potential for rowdyism it offered, but the tradition re-emerged.

References

October observances
Dorset folklore
Fairs in England
Sherborne